Gurdwara Makhdoom Pur Pahoran is a gurdwara situated at Makhdoom Pur Pahoran, a town between Tulamba and Kabirwala.

History
A narrative tells that Guru Nanak set out from Pakpattan and reached a place near Tulamba where Sajjan Thug had set up a trap in the form of a caravan inn. He used to rob the travellers and made an attempt to trap Guru Nanak but failed. Guru Nanak created this Shabd here; Bronze is bright and shiny, but when it is rubbed, its blackness appears. Washing it, its impurity is not removed, even if it is washed a hundred times. Hearing this Shabd,  Sajjan became a friend of Guru. Sajjan's inn was converted into a Gurdwara to commemorate this event.

Bhai Jodh Singh, disciple and Army General (Battle of Gurusar) of Sat Guru Har Gobind Ji was a resident of this village; this Gurdwara was built by one of his descendants in Samvat 1970. Following the partition in 1947, a new Gurdwara was set up in Panipat Haryana by his descendants (Bhayana Clan).

Status
The boundary of the gurdwara runs around in area of two ghumaon with Gurasthan at its centre: There used to be a big pool (made of marble) west of it which has now been filled with soil and levelled; if this soil is dug out, the original pool can be restored. Rooms for the stay of Sangat have been built along the boundary wall. There are green trees, flowery creepers, rose, jasmine and other plants whose flowers blossom all around. At present, Govt Higher Secondary School is housed in this building and Gurasthan is made the headmaster's office. The inner design of the dome is still the same as it was centuries ago and so are the tiles of the floor, yet other walls and buildings are regularly white washed.

External links
Photos of Gurdwara Makhdoom Pur Pahoran by Qadeer Ahmad Janjua

Gurdwaras in Pakistan
Khanewal District